The East Germany junior football team was the under-16 (continental competitions) and under-17 (world competitions) football team of East Germany. 

After German reunification in 1990, the Deutscher Fußball Verband der DDR (DFV), and with it the East German team, joined the Deutscher Fußball Bund (DFB).

Competitive record

UEFA U-16 Championship record

FIFA U-17 World Cup record

See also 
 UEFA European Under-17 Football Championship
 FIFA U-17 World Cup

External links
 UEFA Under-17 website Contains full results archive
 The Rec.Sport.Soccer Statistics Foundation Contains full record of U-17/U-16 Championships.

European national under-16 association football teams
East Germany national football team